Spongipellis unicolor is a species of polypore fungus in the family Polyporaceae. It is a plant pathogen that affects oak trees. The fungal hyphae grow inside the tree, rotting the heartwood.  The fruit bodies are initially whitish to buff in color before turning brownish in age. The pores on the underside of the cap are circular to angular. Spores are held in tubes and are ovoid to ellipsoid, with dimensions of 7–9 by 6–7 μm.

References

Fungi described in 1822
Fungi of North America
Fungal tree pathogens and diseases
Polyporaceae